Admiral Sir Bertram Sackville Thesiger  (14 January 1875 – 12 May 1966) was a Royal Navy officer who went on to be Commander-in-Chief, East Indies Station.

Early life
He was the son of Hon. Sir Edward Pierson Thesiger, Clerk to the House of Lords, and Georgina Mary Stopford.

Naval career
Thesiger joined the Royal Navy in 1887. Promoted to commander he was made CMG in the 1911 Coronation Honours.

He served in World War I as commanding officer of HMS Inconstant at the Battle of Jutland and was invested as a Companion of the Order of the Bath (CB) in 1916. He became Admiral Superintendent Portsmouth Dockyard in 1925 and Commander-in-Chief, East Indies Station in 1927; he retired with the rank of admiral in 1932.

He was recalled during World War II to be Convoy Commodore, with the rank of commodore, 2nd class Royal Naval Reserve from 1940 to 1942 and then to be Flag Officer in charge at Falmouth from 1942 to 1944. He was made a Knight Commander of the British Empire (KBE) in the 1942 New Year Honours and also a Commander of the American Legion of Merit.

He became deputy lieutenant of Hampshire and lived at "Clerks" in Bramshott in Hampshire.

Family
In 1921 he married Violet Brodrick Cloete (née Henley) in Malta.

References

1875 births
1966 deaths
Royal Navy admirals of World War II
Knights Commander of the Order of the British Empire
Companions of the Order of the Bath
Companions of the Order of St Michael and St George
Deputy Lieutenants of Hampshire
People from Bramshott
Bertram
Royal Naval Reserve personnel